RJR-2429 is a drug that acts as an agonist at neural nicotinic acetylcholine receptors, binding to both the α3β4 and the α4β2 subtypes. RJR-2429 is stronger than nicotine but weaker than epibatidine in most assays, and with high affinity for both α3β4 and α4β2 subtypes, as well as the less studied α1βγδ subtype.

References 

Nicotinic agonists
Nitrogen heterocycles